In Inuit religion, Nerrivik or Nerivik was the sea-mother and provider of food for Inuit. She was the patron of fisherman and hunters. In Canada, she was known as either Sedna or Arnapkapfaaluk and in Greenland, she was Arnakuagsak.

Myth 
Nerrivik married the storm-god, who afterwards produced a storm at sea while her male relatives were ferrying her back to their homeland secretly when her husband had been absent hunting. Her relatives having cast her overboard in order to calm the storm, her grandfather cut off the hand with which she continued to grasp the boat; therefore she is now, one-handed, at the bottom of the sea. (Rasmussen, 1921, p. 113) This myth is from the Inughuit (Polar Eskimos), of Smith Sound (in northern Greenland).

Notes

References 
Rasmussen, Knud (1921) : Eskimo Folk-Tales

Inuit mythology
Inuit goddesses
Sea and river goddesses
Hunting goddesses